The Macau national rugby union team represents Macau in international rugby union. Macau are a member of the International Rugby Board (IRB), and have yet to play in a Rugby World Cup tournament.

Record

Overall

See also
 Rugby union in Macau

References
 Macau rugby data

Asian national rugby union teams
Rugby union in Macau
National sports teams of Macau
Macau rugby union teams